The Ven. Joseph Sager (1694–1757) was Archdeacon of Sarum from 1727 to 1732.

Sager was born in Wakefield and educated at Corpus Christi College, Cambridge and ordained in 1720. He was the Incumbent at North Tidworth until 1724; and then a Canon Residentiary at Salisbury Cathedral  until his death on 18 July 1757.

References

Archdeacons of Sarum
18th-century English Anglican priests
1694 births
1757 deaths
People from Wakefield